Mie may refer to:

Places
 Mie, Ōita, a former town in Ōita Prefecture, Japan
 Mie District, Mie, a district in Mie Prefecture, Japan
 Mie Prefecture, a prefecture of Japan
 Mie University, a national university in Tsu, Mie Prefecture, Japan

Other uses
 Mie (train), a train service in Japan
 Mie (crater), a crater on Mars
 Mie (pose), a pose in Kabuki theatre
 Mie goreng, an Indonesian dish
 Mie Kotsu, a Japanese public transportation company
 Mie theory or Mie scattering, a solution of Maxwell's equations for the scattering of electromagnetic radiation

People
 Mie (singer), Japanese singer and actress, member of the duo Pink Lady

Given name
 Mie Augustesen (born 1988), Danish handball player
 Mie Hama (born 1943), Japanese actress
 Mie Hamada (born 1959), Japanese figure skater and coach
 Mie Kumagai, Sega video game producer
 Mie Lacota (born 1988), Danish professional road and track cyclist
 Mie Mie (born 1970), Burmese democracy activist
 Mie Sonozaki (born 1973), Japanese voice actress and singer
Mie Suzuki (born 1958), Japanese voice actress
 , Japanese speed skater

Surname
 Gustav Mie (1869–1957), German physicist

See also 
 
 MIE (disambiguation)
 Mies (disambiguation)

Japanese feminine given names